Tales of Mystery & Imagination (often rendered as Tales of Mystery and Imagination) is a popular title for posthumous compilations of writings by American author, essayist and poet Edgar Allan Poe and was the first complete collection of his works specifically restricting itself to his suspenseful and related tales.

Background
In 1839, during Poe's lifetime, a collection of his strange tales was published, but it did not include some highly regarded tales which were written later, including "The Murders in the Rue Morgue" and "A Descent into the Maelström". The first posthumous collection of Poe's works was compiled in 1850 and included a memoir from Rufus Wilmot Griswold, but this did not confine itself to his tales of suspense and related tales. Several collections of Poe's prose and poetry followed. The precursor to Tales of Mystery and Imagination was a collection of Poe's works entitled Tales of Mystery, Imagination and Humor. The title "Tales of Mystery and Imagination" was first used by "The World's Classics", London, and printed by Grant Richard, 48 Leicester Sq. in 1902. The title of this collection was then adopted by Padraic Colum in 1908 in view of the growing reputation of Poe's taste for suspense, especially in the context of what his French critic M. Brunetiere called events "on the margin" of life. The original collection, in keeping with its title, deliberately excluded Poe's poems, comedies and essays. In his introduction to the 1908 edition Colum cites a reason for his adoption of this selection: his opinion that "tales" as opposed to "short stories" were so short that they tended to lack descriptions of socially important experiences. Colum hence also left out two works as too lengthy, these being The Narrative of Arthur Gordon Pym of Nantucket and "The Unparalleled Adventure of One Hans Pfaall".

Colum's 1908 collection of Poe's tales was published as a book specifically aimed at the general reading public by the influential publishing house of Geoffrey Newnes Ltd. using its Home Library Book Company, as part of "John O'London's" Home Library.

Further development
The 1908 version of Tales of Mystery and Imagination has been reproduced many times since under this same title by several publishers across the world for over 100 years, and Colum's selection of tales forms the backbone of subsequent versions under this same name. Everyman's Library produced their own copies of the 1908 version for several decades. The title of the 1908 book together with its formula of compiling Poe's most bewildering tales into a single volume continues to be used by other publishers.

In 1919 London's George G. Harrap and Co. published an edition illustrated by Harry Clarke in black and white. In 1923 an expanded edition was released with many more illustrations, including eight color plates. In 1935 the artist Arthur Rackham produced another illustrated version of Tales of Mystery and Imagination.

A musical album entitled Tales of Mystery and Imagination by The Alan Parsons Project uses the same title. It contains tracks based on three of these tales and several others, including poetry, with some narration by Orson Welles. Alan Parsons Project also used the title "The Gold Bug" for a track on their The Turn of a Friendly Card album. The title, and Poe himself, are also mentioned in the Van Morrison song "Fair Play" from the album Veedon Fleece.

Stories 
 "William Wilson"
 "The Gold Bug"
 "The Fall of the House of Usher"
 "The Masque of the Red Death"
 "The Cask of Amontillado"
 "A Descent into the Maelström"
 "The Pit and the Pendulum"
 "The Purloined Letter"
 "Metzengerstein"
 "The Murders in the Rue Morgue"
 "The Tell-Tale Heart"
 "The Black Cat"

See also
 Harry Clarke - Darkness In Light Film on the quintessential illustrator of this collection.
 Edgar Allan Poe in television and film

Notes

Works by Edgar Allan Poe
1908 short story collections
Horror short story collections
Books illustrated by Arthur Rackham